Shadow is a 1956 Polish film directed by Jerzy Kawalerowicz. It was entered into the 1956 Cannes Film Festival.

Plot
The plot involves a Rashōmon-like investigation into the life of a man who has been found dead after having been hurled from a train. As security agents, police and a medical examiner piece together his identity, three accounts emerge: one set during World War II, one in the immediate aftermath of the war, and one in contemporary Poland. In each account, the victim seems to have been a mysterious, ambiguous presence, of shifting loyalties and suspicious connections, who set himself against the  powers that be.

Critics attacked the film for its depiction of a world rife with secret agents and hidden enemies—a favorite Stalinist theme—while the film seems, rather, to demonstrate how heroism and villainy are often matters of point of view and timing.

Cast
 Zygmunt Kęstowicz as Knyszyn
 Adolf Chronicki as Karbowski
 Emil Karewicz as Jasiczka
 Ignacy Machowski as Shadow
 Tadeusz Jurasz as Mikuła
 Bolesław Płotnicki as Railwayman
 Bohdan Ejmont as Officer
 Marian Łącz as Stefan
 Zdzisław Szymański as Peasant
 Halina Przybylska as Village Woman
 Antoni Jurasz as Lt. Antoni
 Wiesław Gołas as Underground Soldier
 Barbara Połomska as Stefan's Friend
 Stanisław Mikulski as Blonde
 Roman Kłosowski as Witold

See also 
Cinema of Poland
List of Polish language films

References

External links

1956 films
1950s Polish-language films
Films directed by Jerzy Kawalerowicz
1956 crime films
Polish black-and-white films
Polish crime films